Calosoma anthrax is a species of ground beetle in the family Carabidae. It is found in China and Mongolia.

Subspecies
These two subspecies belong to the species Calosoma anthrax:
 Calosoma anthrax anthrax Semenov, 1900  (China and Mongolia)
 Calosoma anthrax grumi Semenov, 1900  (China)

References

Calosoma